Ronnie Brody (6 November 1918 – 8 May 1991) was a British actor who appeared in many comedy television series and films.

His film appearances included: A Funny Thing Happened on the Way to the Forum, Carry On Loving, Don't Lose Your Head, Finders Keepers, Superman 3 and The Beatles film Help!.

His television appearances included: The Benny Hill Show, Hancock's Half Hour, Rising Damp, Dad's Army, The Sweeney (Episode 3, Series 3, "Visiting Fireman" – Garage Mechanic), Dave Allen at Large and The Goodies (episode "Punky Business"), ''Are You Being Served?, Hi-de-Hi!, Bless This House (Episode 3, Series 3, "Entente Not So Cordiale?" – Henri) and Carry On Laughing,

Filmography

External links

References

1918 births
1991 deaths
English male film actors
English male television actors
Male actors from Bristol
20th-century English male actors